Winter 1971 United Kingdom Tour was a concert tour of the United Kingdom by Led Zeppelin. The tour ran from 11 November to 21 December 1971, and "confirmed their supremacy in the UK rock marketplace". Taking place immediately after the release of the band's fourth album, Led Zeppelin IV, all tickets sold out despite going on sale less than a week before the commencement of the tour.  Second shows at Wembley and at Manchester were added after fans queued for up to eighteen hours in order to secure a ticket.

This tour is particularly notable for the two concerts performed by the band at the Wembley Empire Pool, Wembley Park, dubbed the "Electric Magic" shows. These five hour shows included bizarre vaudeville circus acts with plate spinners, trapeze artists and performing pigs which were dressed in policeman's uniforms. The concerts also incorporated supporting acts such as Stone the Crows, which was a rare event for Led Zeppelin at this point in their career.  A colour poster was sold to fans at the concerts for 30p, which is now a rare and highly sought-after collectible. An altered version of the poster was created for a two coloured silk-screen T-shirt print in 2010 for an official Led Zeppelin T-shirt.

This was the first concert tour on which the band visually projected the "four symbols" which adorned (and is a variant title for) their fourth album onto their stage equipment. Jimmy Page's "Zoso" symbol was put onto one of his Marshall amplifiers, John Bonham's three interlinked circles adorned the outer face of his bass drum, John Paul Jones had his symbol stenciled onto material which was draped across his Fender Rhodes keyboard and Robert Plant's feather symbol was painted onto a side speaker PA cabinet. Plant's feather symbol was the only one not used in subsequent Led Zeppelin concert tours, and Jones' symbol was removed after the Japanese Tour in 1972.

Tour set list
All track written by Jimmy Page and Robert Plant, except where noted.

The fairly typical set list for the tour was:

"Immigrant Song"
"Heartbreaker" (Bonham, Page, Plant)
"Out on the Tiles" (intro) (Page, Plant, Bonham) / "Black Dog" (Page, Plant, Jones)
"Since I've Been Loving You" (Page, Plant, Jones)
"Rock and Roll" (Page, Plant, Jones, Bonham)
"Stairway to Heaven"
"Going to California"
"That's the Way"
"Tangerine" (Page)
"Bron-Yr-Aur Stomp" (Page, Plant, Jones)
"Dazed and Confused" (Page)
"What Is and What Should Never Be"
"Celebration Day" (Jones, Page, Plant)
"Moby Dick" (Bonham) (on November 13, 20, 21, and 23 only)
"Whole Lotta Love" (Bonham, Dixon, Jones, Page, Plant)

Encores (variations of the following list):
"Communication Breakdown" (Bonham, Jones, Page)
"Thank You" (On 24 November)
"Gallows Pole" (on 16 November only)
"Weekend" (Post) (on 13 and 16 November and 2 December only)
"It'll Be Me" (on 29 November and 2 December only)

There were some set list substitutions, variations, and order switches during the tour.

Tour dates

References

External links
Comprehensive archive of known concert appearances by Led Zeppelin (official website)
Led Zeppelin concert setlists

Sources
Lewis, Dave and Pallett, Simon (1997) Led Zeppelin: The Concert File, London: Omnibus Press. .

Led Zeppelin concert tours
1971 concert tours
1971 in the United Kingdom
Concert tours of the United Kingdom